Spartoo.co.uk is an e-commerce website specialising in shoes and clothing created in 2009 as part of the company Spartoo.com, created in 2006 and based in Grenoble, France. The name of the company was inspired by the gladiator sandal or "spartiate" from the town of Sparte, a major power in ancient Greece. Spartoo was modelled after the American company Zappos, an online shoe retailer. Spartoo is now present in 30 European countries. They sell primarily footwear, but also carry ready-to-wear fashion for men and women.

Expansion in Europe
 2006 : Spartoo.com launches with 1.2 million euros in investments
 2007 : 4.3 million euros in investments gained for expansion
 2009 : Launch of Spartoo.co.uk, and Spartoo is named one of the fastest-growing companies in Europe by Media Momentum
 2010 : Spartoo.com raises 12.3 million euros in investments for expansion in Europe, acquires the retail website Sacby.com, creates the luxury retail website Le-Temple.com, and buys the retail website Shoes.fr.
 2010 : Launch of Spartoo.es and Spartoo.de
 2011 : Spartoo.com buys the English retail shoe website Rubbersole.co.uk, and launches Spartoo in 20 countries  including: Netherlands, Finland, Belgium, Poland, Sweden, Portugal, Greece, and Denmark
 2012 : Spartoo raises more investment funds, and is judged one of the fastest-growing companies in Europe at the Media Momentum awards 
 2013 : Spartoo launches a clothing line, Spartoo.co.uk opens a warehouse in the UK, and launches a local television ad

Turnover
 2012 : 150 million euros
 2011 : 100 million euros
 2010 : 50 million euros
 2009 : 30 million euros
 2008 : 15 million euros
 2007 : 5 million euros

References

External links
Official Website
Online Womenswear

Online retailers of the United Kingdom